France was present at the Eurovision Song Contest 1981, held in Dublin, Ireland.

Before Eurovision

Concours de la Chanson Française pour l'Eurovision 1981 
The final was held on 8 March 1981 at the TF1 Studios in Paris, and was hosted by television hostess Fabienne Égal. Six songs made it to the national final after two semi-final heats. The winner was decided by a random sampling of 1,086 television viewers who were contacted by TF1 and asked which song was their favorite.

The winning entry was "Humanahum", performed by Jean Gabilou and composed by Jean-Paul Cara with lyrics by Joe Gracy. Cara and Gracy also penned the 1977 Contest winner "L'oiseau et l'enfant". Gabilou, a Tahitian singer, was the first ever to represent France from one of its overseas territories.

The order of the songs presented on the night of the Contest vary from other published material.

At Eurovision
Jean Gabilou performed ninth on the night of the contest, following Finland and preceding Spain. At the close of the voting the song had received 125 points, placing 3rd in a field of 20 competing countries. Despite finishing in the top three, TF1's head of entertainment programming, Pierre Bouteiller, famously opted out of the 1982 Contest, referring to Eurovision as "a monument to inanity [sometimes translated as "drivel"]." France would return to the fold in 1983, albeit with a different broadcaster, Antenne 2.

Voting

References 

1981
Countries in the Eurovision Song Contest 1981
Eurovision
Eurovision